Lithocarpus muluensis is a tree in the beech family Fagaceae. It is named for Gunung Mulu mountain in Sarawak, Borneo.

Description
The bark is flaky. Flowers are unknown.

Distribution and habitat
Lithocarpus muluensis is endemic to Borneo, where it is confined to Gunung Mulu National Park in Sarawak. Its habitat is mixed dipterocarp to montane forest, up to  altitude.

References

muluensis
Endemic flora of Borneo
Flora of Sarawak
Plants described in 1998